This article lists multi-sport events held by Thailand.

Bangkok

Chiang Mai

Chonburi

Nakhon Ratchasima

Phuket

Suphan Buri

Notes

Multi-sport events in Thailand